Virginia Tower Norwood (born January 1927) is a retired American physicist. She is best known for her contribution to the Landsat program having designed the Multispectral Scanner which was first used on Landsat 1. She has been called "The Mother of Landsat" for this work.

Education 

Norwood was accepted into the Massachusetts Institute of Technology with a partial scholarship in 1944 and graduated in 1947 with a degree in mathematical physics.

While working at the United States Army Signal Corps in New Jersey she took engineering classes through a Rutgers University Extension programme.

Career 

A year after graduating from MIT she was hired by the US Army Signal Corps Laboratories in Fort Monmouth, New Jersey. She began working on weather radar, later designing a radar reflector for weather balloons before progressing to work on microwave antenna design.

After five years at the Signal Corps she moved to Los Angeles and began working for Hughes Aircraft Company. She worked there for 36 years on a range of projects that included antenna design, communications links, optics and the Landsat scanners. During that period she designed the microwave transmitter that Surveyor 1 used to transmit data and images back to earth

Norwood designed a six-band multispectral scanner for use on the first Landsat mission. Due to mission constraints the prototype was revised to use only four bands. The Multispectral Scanner, as it was known, was carried on Landsat 1. An improved seven band version, known as the Thematic Mapper was later included on Landsat 4.

Norwood retired in 1989. A biographical article published by NASA in 2020 referred to her as "The Mother of Landsat".

Patents 

Norwood filed and held three patents. Two of them are: a radar reflector designed to track weather balloons, novel folded tracking antenna.

Awards 

In 1979 Norwood received the William T. Pecora Award. The award recognizes achievements in the scientific and technical remote sensing community, as well as contributions leading to successful practical applications of remote sensing. The award is sponsored jointly by the U.S. Department of the Interior and the National Aeronautics and Space Administration.

In 2021 Norwood was given an Honorary Lifetime Achievement Award by the American Society for Photogrammetry and Remote Sensing, the highest honour that society bestows on any individual.

References

1927 births
Living people
Massachusetts Institute of Technology alumni
20th-century American physicists
Women physicists
20th-century American women scientists
United States Army women civilians
21st-century American women